{{DISPLAYTITLE:C32H48O9}}
The molecular formula C32H48O9 (molar mass: 576.72 g/mol, exact mass: 576.3298 u) may refer to:

 Cerberin, a cardiac glycoside
 Oleandrin, a cardiac glycoside

Molecular formulas